The Tombs of the Joseon dynasty refers to the 40 tombs of members of the House of Yi, which ruled Korea (at the time known as Joseon, and later as the Korean Empire) between 1392–1910. These tombs are scattered over 18 locations across the Korean Peninsula. They were built to honor and respect the ancestors and their achievements, and assert their royal authority. The tombs have been registered as an UNESCO World Heritage Site since 2009. Two other Joseon tombs, located in Kaesong, North Korea, were proposed but not submitted.

Structure of the tombs
The royal tombs can be divided into three main sections:

The part around Jeongjagak
It is the meeting point between the dead and the living. The area around Hongsalmun gate is the space for the living.

The area just past the gate
This is the space between the earthly and the holy. This is the area where the spirits of the kings and queens meet their earthly worshippers. This area also contains the Jeongjagak shrine, the Subokbang, and the Suragan buildings.

The sacred ground of the grave mounds
This area also includes the wall, and the other stone structures.

Other structures

Other structures include:

 Gokjang – these are the five sides of walls around the grave mound that protects the sacred area.
 Seokho – the tiger deity which serves as the guardian of the Bongbun.
 Seogyang – a sheep statue which fends off the evil spirits from earth and prays for the souls of the departed.
 Mangjuseok – this is a pair of stone pillars erected on both sides of the mound.
 Bongbun – this is where the body of the king or queen lies. It is also called Neungchim or Neungsang.
 Nanganseok – it is the hedge-like stone which protects the Byeongpungseok.
 Honnyuseok – a rectangular stone erected in front of the mound which is believed to invite the soul to come out and play.
 Muninseok – statues of scholars placed on the left and right sides of the Jangmyeongdeung lantern.
 Jangmyeongdeung – a lantern which comforts and prays blessing over the soul.
 Seongma – a horse statue.
 Muinseok – statue of a soldier said to be guarding the king and is placed below the Muninseok.
 Yegam – it is located on the left-side corner behind the Jeongjagak and is used for burning the written prayers after a burial service.
 Bigak – a building which has a stone monument where the names of the king and the queen are written at the front, while at the back was written the list of the king's accomplishments.
 Jeongjagak – this is where memorial services are held.
 Chamdo – these are two stone-covered paths that leads to the Jeongjagak. The higher path is called Sindo (The Path of the Gods), while the lower path is called Eodo (The Path Of the King). Only the Eodo path can be used by visitors in accordance to Korean custom.
 Suragan – this is where the food for the memorial services are brought and prepared.
 Subokbang – this is the living quarter of the officer guarding the tomb.
 Baewi – this is where the king and memorial service officials knelt in honor of the deceased king. It is also called Panwi or Eobaseok.
 Hongsalmun – this is the gate with two red cylindrical pillars.
 Byeongpungseok – it is the stone which was placed underneath and around to protect the Bongbun.

Tombs
The tombs are classified into two types. The kings and queens and those posthumously granted the title of king or queen, were interred in neung-type tombs. Crown princes and their wives were interred in won-type tombs.

Other members of the royal family were interred in myo-type tombs.

The royal tombs are scattered over 18 locations, with many of them located as far as 40 kilometers from Seoul. For example, Jangneung is in Yeongwol, Gangwon Province, while Yeongneung is in Yeoju, Gyeonggi Province. Tombs were made for individuals as well as family groups. There are 40 neung-type and 13 won-type tombs, thus creating a total of 53 royal tombs.

Joseon-era royal tombs followed the guidelines outlined in Chinese Confucian texts, such as the Book of Rites (Li Ji) and the Rites of Zhou (Zhou Li). Many factors went into consideration when deciding the location of a tomb, such as the distance from Hanseong (present-day Seoul), the distance in relation to other royal tombs, the accessibility of the location, and Korean traditions of pungsu (geomancy). The tomb construction also took into account traditional burial rituals of Korea and the natural environment.

There now follows a list (in alphabetical order) of the individual (or clusters of) tombs. There are two more royal tombs from the Joseon Dynasty in Kaesong, North Korea, namely Jeneung (제릉) (the tomb of Queen Sinui, first wife of King Taejo) and Huneung (후릉) (the tombs of King Jeongjong and Queen Jeongan).

Dongguneung Cluster (동구릉)

This cluster is the best sample of group tombs from the Joseon era and represents the evolution of tomb architecture over a period of five hundred years. Seven kings and ten queens are interred in nine neung-type tombs. The most notable in this group is Geonwonneung (건원릉) for King Taejo, the founder of the Joseon dynasty. The other tombs in the cluster are Gyeongneung (경릉) (King Heonjeong and his two wives, Queen Hyohyeon and Queen Hyojeong), Hyeneung (혜릉) (Queen Danui, first wife of King Gyeongjong), Hwineung (휘릉) (Queen Jangnyeol, second wife of King Injo), Mongneung (목릉) (King Seonjo and his two wives, Queen Uiin and Queen Inmok), Sungneung (숭릉) (King Hyeonjong and Queen Myeongseong), Suneung (수릉) (Crown Prince Hyomyeong, who was posthumously honored as King Munjo, and Queen Sinjeong), Wonneung (원릉) (King Yeongjo and his second wife, Queen Jeongsun) and Myeongbinmyo (명빈묘) (Royal Noble Consort Myeong of the Andong Kim clan, a concubine of King Taejong). The cluster is situated on the west bank of the Wangsukcheon Stream in the city of Guri, Gyeonggi Province.

Gwangneung (광릉)

Gwangneung is a pair of tombs in the city of Namyangju, Gyeonggi Province. The tombs, arranged in a V shape, contain the remains of King Sejo and his wife, Queen Jeonghui. They were built in 1468 and 1483 respectively. Gwangneung is important because changes taking place in the architecture of royal tombs are evident in its construction. Screening rocks were not installed at this tomb. Instead of an outer coffin stone, quicklime was used. Another break from tradition was that the reverential access was not built. Finally, only one T-shaped ritual shrine was built for both burial mounds. This change in tomb architecture came from the last wishes of the king and reflects a new frugal style that influenced later royal tomb construction.

Heoninneung (헌인릉)

Heonneung: 

Inneung: 

This site is located in the south of Seoul, at the bottom of the southern slope of Daemosan Mountain. Heonneung is a pair of tombs holding the remains of Taejong of Joseon and Queen Wongyeong, while Inneung is a single mound situated two hundred metres to the west and holds the remains of King Sunjo and Queen Sunwon.

Hongyuneung (홍유릉) 
Hongneung: 

Yuneung: 

Yeongwon: 

The styles of the two main tombs reflect the political changes experienced by Korea during the waning days of the Joseon dynasty. With the declaration of the Korean Empire, the style of the tombs of the last two rulers, Emperor Gojong and Emperor Sunjong were designed to reflect their new status. Hongneung holds the remains of Emperor Gojong and Empress Myeongseong. Yuneung holds the remains of Emperor Sunjong and his two wives, Empress Sunmyeong and Empress Sunjeong. Other notable tombs include Yeongwon (영원), the tomb of Yi Un, Crown Prince Euimin and Yi Bang-ja, Crown Princess Euimin. They are located in the city of Namyangju, just to the east of Seoul.

Jangneung (Gimpo) (김포 장릉)

There are three locations with Joseon tombs named Jangneung. This particular double tomb is found in Gimpo, Gyeonggi Province, near the border with Incheon. It holds the remains of Prince Jeongwon (who was posthumously honored as King Wonjong) and Queen Inheon, the parents of King Injo.

Jangneung (Paju) (파주 장릉)

This tomb is located in Paju, Gyeonggi Province, near the confluence of the Rivers Imjin and Han, where the Osusan Observatory overlooks North Korea. It holds the remains of King Injo and his first wife, Queen Inyeol.

Jangneung (Yeongwol) (영월 장릉)

This tomb lies in the county of Yeongwol, Gangwon Province and is the furthest from the capital. It holds the remains of King Danjong.

Jeongneung (정릉)

Not to be confused with the more famous Jeongneung in the area of Bukhansan Mountain. This tomb is also in Seoul, but north of the Han River. It holds remains of Queen Sindeok, the second wife of King Taejo.

Onneung (온릉)

Onneung is a tomb located in Yangju, Gyeonggi Province, just to the north of the Capital Region First Ring Expressway's Songchu Interchange. It holds the remains of Queen Dangyeong, first wife of King Jungjong.

Paju Samneung Cluster (파주 삼릉)
Gongneung: 

Sunneung: 

Yeongneung: 

Located in this cluster are Gongneung (공릉) (Queen Jangsun, first wife of King Yejong), Sunneung (술릉) (Queen Gonghye, first wife of King Seongjong and younger sister of Queen Jangsun) and Yeongneung (영릉) (Crown Prince Hyojang, who was posthumously honored as King Jinjong, and Queen Hyosun). It is situated in the city of Paju, Gyeonggi Province. Yeongneung is not to be confused with King Sejong's tomb in Yeoju.

Saneung (사릉)

This tomb is in Namyangju, Gyeonggi Province, 1.6 km from Geumgok Station. It holds the remains of Queen Jeongsun, wife of King Danjong.

Seonjeongneung (선정릉) 

Seonneung: 

Jeongneung: 

Located in the south of Seoul, Jeongneung (not to be confused with its namesake on the southern slopes of Bukhansan Mountain, also in Seoul) is the tomb of King Jungjong, while Seonneung holds the remains of King Seongjong and his third wife, Queen Jeonghyeon. The tombs are in a park, the entrance of which is 340 metres from Seolleung Station.

Seooneung Cluster (서오릉)
Changneung: 

Hongneung: 

Gyeongneung: 

Ingneung: 

Myeongneung: 

Daebinmyo: 

Sugyeongwon: 

Sunchangwon: 

A group of tombs in Goyang, Gyeonggi Province, it holds Changneung (창릉) (King Yejong and his second wife, Queen Ansun), Hongneung (홍릉) (Queen Jeongseong, first wife of King Yeongjo; not to be confused with the resting place of Empress Myeongseong and Emperor Gojong in Namyangju), Gyeongneung (경릉) (Crown Prince Uigyeong, who was posthumously honored as King Deokjong, and Queen Sohye, better known as Queen Insu), Ingneung (익릉) (Queen Ingyeong, first wife of King Sukjong) and Myeongneung (명릉) (the twin tombs of King Sukjong and his second wife, Queen Inhyeon; and Danneung (단릉), the tomb of Sukjong's third wife, Queen Inwon). Other notable tombs include Daebinmyo (대빈묘) (Royal Noble Consort Hui of the Indong Jang clan, a concubine of King Sukjong and the mother of King Gyeongjong), Sugyeongwon (수경원) (Royal Noble Consort Yeong of the Jeonui Yi clan, a concubine of King Yeongjo and the biological mother of Crown Prince Sado) and Sunchangwon (순창원) (Crown Prince Sunhoe and Crown Princess Gonghoe).

Seosamneung Cluster (서삼릉)

Huineung: 

Hyoneung: 

Yeneung: 

Hoimyo: 

Hyochangwon: 

Uiryeongwon: 

Seosamneung (literally translated to "The Three Western Tombs") is situated in Goyang, Gyeonggi Province, 20 km from Seoul. The cluster holds Huineung (휘릉) (Queen Janggyeong, second wife of King Jungjong), Hyoneung (효릉) (King Injong and Queen Inseong) and Yeneung (예릉) (King Cheoljong and Queen Cheorin). There are fifty other tombs, most notably Hoimyo (회묘) (Deposed Queen Yun, second wife of King Seongjong and the mother of Yeonsangun), Hyochangwon (효창원) (Crown Prince Munhyo), Sogyeongwon (소경원) (Crown Prince Sohyeon, situated in an undisclosed area) and Uiryeongwon (의령원) (Crown Prince Uiso). The cluster serves as resting place for many other princes and princesses, as well as three of King Jeongjo's concubines (including Royal Noble Consort Ui of the Changnyeong Seong clan), and a concubine of King Heonjong (Royal Noble Consort Gyeong of the Gwangsan Kim clan). Additionally, monuments built to house the royal placenta and umbilical cords (known as taesil), which had once been scattered all over Korea, have also been gathered here.

Taegangneung (태강릉)
Taeneung: 

Gangneung: 

Located in eastern Seoul, 1 km from each other, Taeneung (태릉) holds the remains of Queen Munjeong, while Gangneung (강릉) is the resting place of her son and daughter-in-law, King Myeongjong and Queen Insun.

Uineung (의릉)

Uineung is a pair of tombs arranged in a line, holding the remains of King Gyeonjong and his second wife, Queen Seonui. It is located in Seokgwan-dong, Seongbuk District, Seoul.

Yeongneung (영릉)

Yeongneung (King Hyojong): 

Yeongneung (King Sejong): 

These identically-named tombs lie in the west of the city of Yeoju, Gyeonggi Province. Sejong the Great and his wife, Queen Soheon, are within a burial mound, surrounded by statues and near a pond and memorial shrine. King Hyojong’s tomb lies in line with the tomb of his wife, Queen Inseon.

Yonggeonneung (융건릉)

Geonneung: 

Yongneung: 

Located within a park in Hwaseong, Gyeonggi Province, Yongneung (융릉) is the resting place of Crown Prince Sado and Lady Hyegyeong (posthumously honored as King Jangjo and Queen Heongyeong), while Geonneung (건릉) holds the remains of King Jeongjo and Queen Hyoui.

See also
 Umbilical cord tomb of Taejo of Joseon dynasty
 Cultural Heritage Administration, responsible for the tombs' administration

References

External links
 UNESCO – Royal Tombs of the Joseon Dynasty
 Oriental Architecture

 
Archaeological sites in South Korea